Ludovic Martin (born 17 March 1976 in Mantes-la-Jolie) is a retired French cyclist. He participated in the 2004 Tour de France and finished in 119th. His sporting career began with Jeunesse Sportive Doloise.

Major results
1998
2nd Paris-Mantes-en-Yvelines
2000
1st stage 4 Tour de Bretagne Cycliste
1st Manche-Ocean
2006
1st Tour Nivernais Morvan
2nd Polymultipliée Lyon
1st Tour du Gévaudan Languedoc-Roussillon

References

1976 births
Living people
French male cyclists
People from Mantes-la-Jolie
Sportspeople from Yvelines
Cyclists from Île-de-France